Vasile Didea (born 1 April 1954) is a Romanian boxer. He competed in the men's light middleweight event at the 1976 Summer Olympics. At the 1976 Summer Olympics, he defeated Michael Prevost and Nayden Stanchev, before losing to Tadija Kačar.

References

1954 births
Living people
Romanian male boxers
Olympic boxers of Romania
Boxers at the 1976 Summer Olympics
People from Caraș-Severin County
Light-middleweight boxers